This is a list of seasons completed by the North Dakota Fighting Hawks football team of the National Collegiate Athletic Association (NCAA) Division I Football Championship Subdivision (FCS). Since the team's creation in 1894, North Dakota has participated in more than 1,100 officially sanctioned games, holding an all-time record of 655–425–30 and one national championship, won in 2001 at the NCAA Division II level. The team was a charter member of the North Central Conference in 1922, remaining in the league until its dissolution in 2008. The Fighting Sioux then transitioned to the FCS, first joining the Great West Conference before moving to the Big Sky Conference in 2012. In 2020, North Dakota will move to the Missouri Valley Football Conference, joining old foes from the team's North Central days.

Seasons

References

North Dakota

North Dakota Fighting Hawks football seasons